"Crazy Little Thing Called Love" is a song by the British rock band Queen. Written by Freddie Mercury in 1979, the track is included on their 1980 album The Game, and also appears on the band's compilation album Greatest Hits in 1981. The song peaked at number two in the UK Singles Chart in 1979, becoming the group's first number-one single on the Billboard Hot 100 in the US in 1980, remaining there for four consecutive weeks. It topped the Australian ARIA Charts for seven weeks. It was the band's final single release of the 1970s.

Having composed "Crazy Little Thing Called Love" on guitar, Mercury played rhythm guitar while performing the song live, which was the first time he played guitar in concert with Queen. Queen played the song live between 1979 and 1986, and a live performance of the song is recorded in the albums Queen Rock Montreal, Queen on Fire – Live at the Bowl, Live at Wembley '86 and  Hungarian Rhapsody: Queen Live in Budapest. Since its release, the song has been covered by a number of artists. The song was played live on 20 April 1992 during The Freddie Mercury Tribute Concert, performed by Robert Plant with Queen. The style of the song was described by author Karl Coryat as rockabilly in his 1999 book titled The Bass Player Book.

Composition
As reported by Freddie Mercury in Melody Maker, 2 May 1981, he composed "Crazy Little Thing Called Love" on the guitar in just five to ten minutes.

The song was written by Mercury as a tribute to his musical heroes Elvis Presley and Cliff Richard. Roger Taylor added in an interview that Mercury wrote it in just 10 minutes while lounging in a bath in the Bayerischer Hof Hotel in Munich during one of their extensive Munich recording sessions. Mercury took it to the studio shortly after writing it and presented it to Taylor and John Deacon. The three of them, with their then new producer Reinhold Mack, recorded it at Musicland Studios in Munich. The entire song was reportedly recorded in less than half an hour (although Mack says it was six hours). Having written "Crazy Little Thing Called Love" on guitar and played an acoustic rhythm guitar on the record, for the first time ever Mercury played guitar in concerts, for example at Live Aid at Wembley Stadium, London in 1985.  Billboard described Brian May's guitar playing as being "stunning in its simplicity."  Cash Box called it a "hip shakin' rockabilly romp" and an "upbeat tune." Record World said that the band "does a superb job of capturing the spirit and sound of the late '50s be-bop rock'n'roll."

May wanted to emulate Rick Nelson's and Presley's longtime guitarist James Burton, and at Macks's suggestion used a Fender Esquire rather than his regular Red Special for the recording session.

Music video
The music video for the song was filmed at Trillion Studios on 21 September 1979 and directed by Dennis De Vallance involving four dancers and a floor of hands. An alternate version was included on the Days of Our Lives DVD and Blu-ray releases.

Live performances
In the immediate aftermath of the single the band embarked on a mini UK tour entitled the Crazy Tour.

Whenever the song was played live, the band added a solid rock ending that extended the under-three-minute track to over five minutes, with May and Mercury providing additional guitars. An example of this is on the CD/DVD Set Live at Wembley '86, where the song continues for five minutes.

On Saturday, 13 July 1985, Queen performed the song for the Live Aid dual-venue benefit concert.

Single release 
The "Crazy Little Thing Called Love" single hit number two in the UK Singles Chart in 1979, and became the first US number-one hit for the band, topping the Billboard Hot 100 for four weeks. It was knocked out of the top spot on this chart by Pink Floyd's "Another Brick in the Wall, Part II". The song also topped the Australian ARIA charts for seven consecutive weeks from 1 March to 12 April 1980. The UK release had "We Will Rock You (live)" as the b-side and America, Australia, Canada had "Spread Your Wings (live)".

Personnel
Freddie Mercury – lead and backing vocals, acoustic guitar, hand claps
Brian May – electric guitar, backing vocals, hand claps
Roger Taylor – drums, backing vocals, hand claps
John Deacon – bass guitar, hand claps
Although Mercury would play an acoustic-electric twelve-string Ovation Pacemaker 1615 guitar and later on an electric six-string Fender Telecaster, both owned by May, in the studio he recorded it with a six-string acoustic with external mics. Mercury also played the original guitar solo on a version which has been lost.

Charts

Weekly charts

Year-end charts

All-time charts

Certifications

Dwight Yoakam version

American country music singer Dwight Yoakam included a cover of the song on his 1999 album Last Chance for a Thousand Years: Dwight Yoakam's Greatest Hits from the 90's. Yoakam's version was released as a single. It debuted at number 65 on the US Billboard "Hot Country Singles & Tracks" chart for the week of 1 May 1999, and peaked at number 12 on the US country singles charts that year. It was also used in a television commercial for clothing retailer Gap at the time of the album's release. The music video was directed by Yoakam. This version appears in the movie  (2006), starring Vince Vaughn and Jennifer Aniston.

Charts

See also
List of Billboard Hot 100 number-one singles of 1980

References

External links
 Lyrics at Queen official website

Queen (band) songs
1980 songs
1980 singles
Number-one singles in Australia
RPM Top Singles number-one singles
Dutch Top 40 number-one singles
Number-one singles in New Zealand
Billboard Hot 100 number-one singles
Cashbox number-one singles
Dwight Yoakam songs
Musical tributes to Elvis Presley
Songs written by Freddie Mercury
EMI Records singles
Reprise Records singles
Alvin and the Chipmunks songs
Rockabilly songs
Song recordings produced by Reinhold Mack
Song recordings produced by Pete Anderson
Elektra Records singles
Hollywood Records singles
British rock-and-roll songs